The 2020–21 Denmark Series was the 56th season of the Denmark Series, the fourth-tier of the Danish football league structure organised by the Danish FA (DBU). The season marked a transitional phase in the structure of the Danish leagues.

This season, the league was divided in four groups of eleven teams each. After the regular season, the top four teams in Groups 1 and 2 faced off in play-offs for a spot in the 2020–21 Danish 2nd Divisions, and the same was the case for Groups 3 and 4, which meant that two teams promoted. One team from the West groups promoted and one from the East groups. Numbers 5 to 11 after the regular season were gathered in two groups with 14 teams in each (Groups 1 and 2 + Groups 3 and 4), where the teams met the teams from the opposite pool once, which meant seven matches in total (the top teams get one extra home game). The teams took all earned points and goals scored with them to the playoffs. A total of 16 teams relegated this season, with the 16 relegated teams distributed depending on the geographical location of the eight relegated teams from the Danish 2nd Division.

Denmark Series East

Group 1

League table

Top goalscorers

Group 2

League table

Top goalscorers

Placement round East

Championship group

Relegation group

Denmark Series West

Group 3

League table

Top goalscorers

Group 4

League table

Top goalscorers

Placement round West

Championship group

Relegation group

References

4
Denmark Series
Denmark Series seasons